From Now On is the third studio album by British soul singer Jaki Graham. It was released on 19 September 1989 in the United Kingdom by EMI Records and in the United States by Orpheus Records.

Release and reception

Ron Wynn of AllMusic wrote, "A gifted British soul vocalist, Jaki Graham has seldom gotten the kind of songs that her great skills could turn into breakout hits. These are mostly disposable formula filler that she tries to elevate but can't, despite often stunning vocal treatments. She's a great producer away from being a star, and could certainly be a great disco diva with the right tracks."

From Now On was reissued digitally on 24 April 2009 through Parlophone Records.

Track listing

 Sides one and two were combined as tracks 1–9 on CD reissues.

Personnel
 Jaki Graham – vocals 
Additional musicians 
 Phillip Ingram – vocals on "I Still Run to You" 
Production
 David Gamson – producer 
 Derek Bramble – producer 
 David Pack – producer 
 Kurtis Mantronik – producer 
 Pete Wingfield – producer 
 Richard James Burgess – producer 
 Weldon Cochren – coordinator

Design
 Andy Earl – photography

References

Jaki Graham albums
1989 albums
EMI Records albums
Parlophone albums
Funk albums by English artists